The 2017 WNBA season was the 19th season for the Connecticut Sun franchise of the WNBA. It was the 15th season for the franchise in Connecticut.  The season tipped off on May 13. The Sun started the season slowly, posting a 1–5 record in May. However, they quickly turned this around going a combined 13–4 in June and July.  A 7–2 record in August saw the Sun near the top of the Eastern Conference standings.  The Sun finished in second place in the East, just one game back of the New York Liberty after going 0–2 in their final games in September.  The Sun earned the 4th seed in the WNBA Playoffs, and a bye into the second round.  In the Second Round, they lost to the Phoenix Mercury.

Transactions

WNBA Draft

Current roster

Game log

Preseason 

|-  style="background:#bbffbb;"
| 1
| May 2
| Chicago
| W 81–72
| Adams (12)
| Jones (7)
| Hightower (3)
| Mohegan Sun Arena  2,782
| 1–0
|- style="background:#bbffbb;"
| 2
| May 3
| Los Angeles
| W 79–62
| Thomas (10)
| Gray (6)
| Banham (4)
| Mohegan Sun Arena  2,809
| 2–0
|- style="background:#bbffbb;"
| 3
| May 7
| New York Liberty
| W 79–57
| Tuck (20)
| Jones (6)
| Thomas (4)
| Columbia University  388
| 3–0

Regular season

|- style="background:#fcc;"
| 1
| May 13
| Atlanta
| L 74–81
| Tuck (21)
| Jones (20)
| 2 Tied (3)
| Mohegan Sun Arena  6,444
| 0–1
|- style="background:#fcc;"
| 2
| May 20
| Indiana
| L 79–81
| Jones (19)
| Jones (12)
| Jones (4)
| Bankers Life Fieldhouse  7,385
| 0–2
|- style="background:#fcc;"
| 3
| May 23
| Minnesota
| L 78–80
| Thomas (18)
| Tuck (10)
| 2 Tied (6)
| Xcel Energy Center  8,033
| 0–3
|- style="background:#fcc;"
| 4
| May 26
| Minnesota
| L 68–82
| Kizer (12)
| 2 Tied (5)
| Thomas (3)
| Mohegan Sun Arena  6,333
| 0–4
|- style="background:#bbffbb;"
| 5
| May 28
| Chicago
| W 97–79
| Jones (23)
| Jones (21)
| Thomas (5)
| Allstate Arena  4,498
| 1–4
|- style="background:#fcc;"
| 6
| May 31
| Washington
| L 76–78
| Stricklen (20)
| Jones (13)
| Thomas (6)
| Verizon Center  5,393
| 1–5

|- style="background:#bbffbb;"
| 7
| June 3
| San Antonio
| W 85–77
| Williams (23)
| Jones (14)
| Thomas (7)
| AT&T Center  7,128
| 2–5
|- style="background:#bbffbb;"
| 8
| June 10
| Atlanta
| W 104–71
| Jones (20)
| Jones (15)
| Thomas (11)
| Mohegan Sun Arena  5,327
| 3–5
|- style="background:#bbffbb;"
| 9
| June 14
| New York
| W 96–76
| Williams (22)
| Jones (12)
| Thomas (8)
| Mohegan Sun Arena  4,818
| 4–5
|- style="background:#bbffbb;"
| 10
| June 17
| Minnesota
| W 98–93
| 2 Tied (20)
| 2 Tied (8)
| Thomas (8)
| Xcel Energy Center  10,121
| 5–5
|- style="background:#bbffbb;"
| 11
| June 23
| New York
| W 94–89
| Thomas (23)
| Thomas (8)
| Thomas (8)
| Madison Square Garden  10,240
| 6–5
|- style="background:#fcc;"
| 12
| June 25
| Dallas
| L 82–96
| Thomas (19)
| Jones (12)
| Thomas (6)
| College Park Center  3,408
| 6–6
|- style="background:#fcc;"
| 13
| June 27
| Los Angeles
| L 79–87
| Thomas (19)
| Jones (17)
| 3 Tied (3)
| Mohegan Sun Arena  6,899
| 6–7
|- style="background:#bbffbb;"
| 14
| June 29
| Seattle
| W 96–89
| Thomas (29)
| Jones (10)
| Thomas (9)
| Mohegan Sun Arena  8,668
| 7–7

|- style="background:#bbffbb;"
| 15
| July 1
| Indiana
| W 91–85
| Jones (29)
| Jones (15)
| Thomas (8)
| Bankers Life Fieldhouse  6,473
| 8–7
|- style="background:#bbffbb;"
| 16
| July 5
| San Antonio
| W 89–56
| Williams (17)
| 2 Tied (8)
| Thomas (8)
| AT&T Center  3,210
| 9–7
|- style="background:#bbffbb;"
| 17
| July 8
| Washington
| W 96–92
| Jones (22)
| Jones (9)
| Thomas (5)
| Mohegan Sun Arena  6,073
| 10–7
|- style="background:#bbffbb;"
| 18
| July 12
| Seattle
| W 83–79
| Stricklen (21)
| Jones (12)
| Thomas (6)
| KeyArena  10,833
| 11–7
|- style="background:#fcc;"
| 19
| July 13
| Los Angeles
| L 77–87
| Jones (20)
| Jones (9)
| Thomas (6)
| Staples Center  9,918
| 11–8
|- style="background:#bbffbb;"
| 20
| July 16
| San Antonio
| W 89–75
| Williams (15)
| Thomas (9)
| Bentley (7)
| Mohegan Sun Arena  6,355
| 12–8
|- style="background:#fcc;"
| 21
| July 19
| New York
| L 80–96
| Jones (14)
| Jones (10)
| Williams (4)
| Madison Square Garden  17,443
| 12–9
|- style="background:#bbffbb;"
| 22
| July 25
| Chicago
| W 93–72
| Thomas (20)
| Jones (10)
| Thomas (8)
| Mohegan Sun Arena  5,631
| 13–9
|- style="background:#bbffbb;"
| 23
| July 30
| Indiana
| W 89–73
| Thomas (15)
| Jones (13)
| Thomas (8)
| Mohegan Sun Arena  6,145
| 14–9

|- style="background:#bbffbb;"
| 24
| August 4
| Phoenix
| W 93–92
| Jones (19)
| Jones (15)
| 3 Tied (4)
| Mohegan Sun Arena  7,331
| 15–9
|- style="background:#bbffbb;"
| 25
| August 8
| Seattle
| W 84–71
| Jones (20)
| Jones (14)
| 2 Tied (3)
| Mohegan Sun Arena  7,853
| 16–9
|- style="background:#bbffbb;"
| 26
| August 12
| 2017 Dallas Wings season
| W 96–88
| Thomas (21)
| Jones (16)
| Bentley (5)
| Mohegan Sun Arena  6,898
| 17–9
|- style="background:#bbffbb;"
| 27
| August 15
| Atlanta
| W 96–75
| Jones (20)
| Jones (13)
| Thomas (6)
| McCamish Pavilion  4,585
| 18–9
|- style="background:#fcc;"
| 28
| August 18
| New York
| L 70–82
| Thomas (15)
| Jones (9)
| Thomas (5)
| Mohegan Sun Arena  7,016
| 18–10
|- style="background:#bbffbb;"
| 29
| August 20
| Phoenix
| W 94–66
| Jones (20)
| Thomas (12)
| Thomas (5)
| Mohegan Sun Arena  8,353
| 19–10
|- style="background:#bbffbb;"
| 30
| August 23
| Dallas
| W 93–87
| Thomas (23)
| Jones (17)
| 2 Tied (5)
| Mohegan Sun Arena  6,465
| 20–10
|- style="background:#fcc;"
| 31
| August 25
| Chicago
| L 83–96
| Thomas (14)
| Jones (11)
| Thomas (3)
| Mohegan Sun Arena  7,761
| 20–11
|- style="background:#bbffbb;"
| 32
| August 29
| Washington
| W 86–76
| Thomas (26)
| Jones (22)
| Jones (6)
| Capital One Arena  10,953
| 21–11

|- style="background:#fcc;"
| 33
| September 1
| Phoenix
| L 66–86
| Thomas (19)
| Jones (9)
| Thomas (5)
| Talking Stick Resort Arena  9,971
| 21–12
|- style="background:#fcc;"
| 34
| September 3
| Los Angeles
| L 70–81
| Williams (19)
| Jones (10)
|  2 Tied (4)
| Staples Center  12,236
| 21–13

Playoffs

|- style="background:#fcc;"
| 1
| September 10
| Phoenix
| L 83-88
| Thomas (20)
| Jones (15)
| Thomas (4)
| Mohegan Sun Arena  8,420
| 0-1

Standings

Playoffs

Awards and honors

References

External links
The Official Site of the Connecticut Sun

Connecticut Sun seasons
Connecticut Sun
Events in Uncasville, Connecticut